is a Japanese football player who plays as an attacking midfielder or a winger for Royal Antwerp and the Japanese national team.

Career
On 20 August 2019, Miyoshi joined Belgian First Division A side Royal Antwerp on loan for a year from Kawasaki Frontale with an option to make the deal permanent.

National team career
In October 2013, Miyoshi was elected to Japan U-17 national team for 2013 U-17 World Cup. He played 3 matches and Japan quarter final run only to lose to Sweden 2–1. In May 2017, he was elected Japan U-20 national team for 2017 U-20 World Cup. At this tournament, he played 3 matches.

On May 24, 2019, Miyoshi has been called by Japan's head coach Hajime Moriyasu to feature in the Copa América played in Brazil. 
He made his debut on 17 June 2019 in the game against Chile, as a 66th-minute substitute for Daizen Maeda.

Club statistics
Updated to 28 February 2023.

1Includes Japanese Super Cup and J. League Championship.

National team statistics

National team statistics

International goals
Scores and results list Japan's goal tally first.

Club
Antwerp
Belgian Cup: 2019–20

International
Japan U-19
AFC U-19 Championship: 2016

References

External links

 

 Profile at Kawasaki Frontale
 
 
 Profile at Eurosport

1997 births
Living people
People from Kawasaki, Kanagawa
Association football people from Kanagawa Prefecture
Japanese footballers
Japan youth international footballers
Japan under-20 international footballers
Japan international footballers
J1 League players
J3 League players
Belgian Pro League players
Kawasaki Frontale players
J.League U-22 Selection players
Hokkaido Consadole Sapporo players
Yokohama F. Marinos players
Royal Antwerp F.C. players
Japanese expatriate footballers
Expatriate footballers in Belgium
Association football midfielders
Footballers at the 2018 Asian Games
Asian Games silver medalists for Japan
Asian Games medalists in football
Medalists at the 2018 Asian Games
2019 Copa América players
Footballers at the 2020 Summer Olympics
Olympic footballers of Japan